Myriopteris gracilis, formerly known as Cheilanthes feei, is a species of lip fern known by the common name slender lip fern or Fee's lip fern.

Description

Myriopteris gracilis grows from a short creeping rhizome with pale to red-brown scales usually with a dark mid-stripe. The leaves are gray to pale green and 6 to 18 cm long and 1.5 to 3 cm wide. Each leaflet on the leaf is divided into lobes which are divided once more into rounded segments (3-pinnate). The undersides of the segments are concave and densely covered with short pale to dark tan hairs. The sori line the edges of the segment undersides and may be buried under the hairs. The fern reproduces asexually by apogamy.

Distribution and habitat
Myriopteris gracilis is native to much of western North America from British Columbia and Alberta to northern Mexico, and throughout much of the central United States. It is found in rocky areas, generally on calcareous rock such as limestone where it grows in cracks and crevices.

Taxonomy
Based on plastid DNA sequence analysis Myriopteris gracilis is part of the lanosa clade of Myriopteris. Its closest analyzed relatives are Myriopteris parryi and Myriopteris longipila.

Works cited

External links

Jepson Manual eFlora (TJM2) treatment of Myriopteris gracilis
USDA Plants Profile
Flora of North America
Photo gallery

gracilis
Ferns of California
Ferns of the United States
Flora of the California desert regions
North American desert flora
Flora of the Southwestern United States
Flora of Missouri
Flora of the West Coast of the United States
Flora of the Western United States
Flora of Northwestern Mexico
Flora of Western Canada
Plants described in 1857
Taxa named by Antoine Laurent Apollinaire Fée